Sangeet may refer to:

 Sangeet (music), a Sanskrit term for music of the Indian subcontinent
 Rabindra Sangeet, songs written and composed by Rabindranath Tagore
 Sangeet Natak, musical drama in Marathi language
 Shyama Sangeet, a genre of Bengali devotional songs
 Sangeet (film), a 1992 Hindi film
 Sangeet Fowdar, Mauritian politician and MP for Constituency No 6 Grand Baie and Poudre D'or, Mauritius

See also
 Sangeeta (disambiguation)